"I Love to Love" is a song recorded by German Eurodance group La Bouche, released in November 1995 as the fourth and last single of their debut album, Sweet Dreams (1995). The song achieved a minor success in comparison with "Be My Lover" and "Sweet Dreams", but made it to number five in Hungary and number six in Australia. On the Eurochart Hot 100, it reached number 37 in February 1996. In Canada, "I Love to Love" peaked at number two on the RPM Dance/Urban chart. The CD maxi's cover features also the title of the fourth track, a cover of "Forget Me Nots", another song taken from the same album. "I Love to Love" earned a gold record in Australia, with a sale of 35,000 singles.

Critical reception
Lynn Dean Ford from Indianapolis Star described "I Love to Love" as a "pounding dance tune" in the vein of Snap! and Real McCoy, noting that their "relentless energy [are] steeped in tension and computerization."

Track listings
 CD single
 "I Love to Love" (radio mix) — 3:58
 "I Love to Love" (radio mix II) — 3:59

 CD maxi
 "I Love to Love" (radio mix) — 3:58
 "I Love to Love" (club mix) — 5:58
 "I Love to Love" (Doug Laurent mix) — 5:41
 "Forget Me Nots" (club mix) — 5:20

 7" maxi
A1. "I Love to Love" (club mix) — 5:54
A2. "I Love to Love" (Doug Laurent mix) — 5:41
B1. "Forget Me Nots" — 6:05
B2. "I Love to Love" — 6:08

Charts

Weekly charts

Year-end charts

Certifications

References

External links

1995 singles
1996 singles
1995 songs
English-language German songs
La Bouche songs
Techno songs